The 1st National Geographic Bee was held in Washington, D.C. on May 19, 1989, sponsored by the National Geographic Society. The final competition was moderated by Jeopardy! host Alex Trebek. The winner was Jack Staddon of Great Bend Seventh-day Adventist Elementary School in Great Bend, Kansas, who won a $25,000 college scholarship. The 2nd-place winner, Michael Shannon of Reading, Massachusetts, won a $15,000 scholarship. The 3rd-place winner, Kieu Luu of Riverdale, Maryland, won a $10,000 scholarship.

References

External links
 National Geographic Bee Official Website

National Geographic Bee